Frederick James Booker (1944–2006), was a male cyclist who competed for England.

Cycling career
He represented England and won a silver medal in the 1,000 metres match sprint, at the 1966 British Empire and Commonwealth Games in Kingston, Jamaica. He also competed and finished fourth in the 1 Km time trial event.

He was a four times national champion and rode for the Birmingham Rover Racing Cycling Club.

References

1944 births
2006 deaths
English male cyclists
Commonwealth Games medallists in cycling
Commonwealth Games silver medallists for England
Cyclists at the 1966 British Empire and Commonwealth Games
Medallists at the 1966 British Empire and Commonwealth Games